Amen is a declaration of affirmation found in the Hebrew Bible and New Testament.

Amen may also refer to:

Arts and entertainment

Film and television
 Amen., a 2002 historical drama film 
 Amen (2010 film), an Indian short film
 Amen (2011 film), a South Korean drama
 Amen (2013 film), a Malayalam film
 Amen (TV series), an American sitcom 1986–1991

Music

Performers
 Amen (American band)
 Amen (Peruvian band)
 Amen (musician) (Jussi Sydänmaa, born 1972), a Finnish guitarist

Albums
 Amén, a 2000 album by Azúcar Moreno
 Amen!, a 1958 album by Della Reese
 Amen (Amen album), 1999
 Amen (Paula Cole album), 1999
 Amen (Rich Brian album), 2018
 Amen (Salif Keita album), 1991
 Amen (So Be It), a 1999 album by Paddy Casey

Songs
 "Amen" (gospel song), a traditional song, popularized by The Impressions with their 1964 version
 "Amen" (Ana Soklič song), the Slovenian entry in the Eurovision Song Contest 2021
 "Amen" (Edens Edge song), 2011
 "Amen" (For King & Country song), 2021
 "Amen" (Francesco Gabbani song), 2015
 "Amen" (Halestorm song), 2015
 "Amen" (Kid Rock song), 2007
 "Amen" (Meek Mill song), 2012
 "Amen" (Vincent Bueno song), the Austrian entry in the Eurovision Song Contest 2021
 "Amen", a song by Sepultura, from Chaos A.D.
 "Amen", a song by Kid Cudi from Speedin' Bullet 2 Heaven
 "Amén", a song from Amén (Azúcar Moreno album)
 "Amen", a song from Behemoth, from The Satanist
 "Amen", a song from Decapitated, from Anticult
 "Amen", a song by Enigma from the 2016 album The Fall of a Rebel Angel
 "Amen", a song by Falz from Moral Instruction
 "Amen", by Todrick Hall from Haus Party, Pt. 1
 "Amen", a song by Jme from the 2015 album Integrity>
 "Amen", a song by Liora, the Israeli entry in the Eurovision Song Contest 1995
 "Amen", a song by Mike Posner from his 2019 album A Real Good Kid
 "Amen", a song by Pusha T from the 2011 album Fear of God II: Let Us Pray

People
 Amen Santo, athlete and actor
 Amen Ogbongbemiga (born 1998), American football player
 Amen Edore Oyakhire (born 1945), Nigerian government official
 Daniel Amen (born 1954), American celebrity doctor
 Irving Amen (1918–2011), American artist
 Jeanne Amen (1863–1923), French painter
 John Amen (1898–1960), chief Interrogator during the Nuremberg War Trials
 José Amén-Palma (born 1926), Ecuadorian surgeon and medical researcher
 Paul Amen (1916–2005), American athlete and banker
 Robert Amen (born 1950), American businessman
 Woody van Amen (born 1936), Dutch artist

Other uses
 Amen (website), a defunct social network
 Amen, Netherlands, a village 
 Amen: The Awakening, a game 
 Amun or Amen, an Ancient Egyptian deity

See also
 
 
 Aman (disambiguation)
 Amin (disambiguation)
 Amon (disambiguation)
 Amun (disambiguation)
 Amen break, a drum break